Sanjie may refer to the following towns in China:

 Sanjie, Mingguang (三界镇), Anhui
 Sanjie, Lingchuan County, Guangxi (三街镇)
 Sanjie, Pengzhou (三界镇), in Pengzhou, Sichuan
 Sanjie, Shengzhou (三界镇), Zhejiang